Chryseobacterium aurantiacum is a bacterium from the genus Chryseobacterium which has been isolated from a Murray cod pisciculture pond.

References 

aurantiacum
Bacteria described in 2007